The 2016–17 season is the 115th season of competitive association football in Spain.

Promotion and relegation

Pre-season

National teams

Spain national football team

Results and fixtures

2016

2017

Managerial changes

2018 FIFA World Cup qualification (UEFA) Group G

Spain women's national football team

Results and fixtures

2016

2017

FIFA competitions

2016 FIFA Club World Cup

Semifinals

Final

UEFA competitions

2016–17 UEFA Champions League

Play-off round

|}

Group stage

Group C

Group D

Group F

Group H

Knockout phase

Round of 16

|}

Quarter-finals

|}

Semi-finals

|}

Final

The final will be played on 3 June 2017 at Millennium Stadium in Cardiff, Wales. The "home" team (for administrative purposes) was determined by an additional draw held after the semi-final draw.

2016–17 UEFA Europa League

Group stage

Group F

Group G

Group L

Knockout Phase

Round of 32

|}

Round of 16

|}

Quarter-finals

|}

Semi-finals

|}

2016 UEFA Super Cup

2016–17 UEFA Women's Champions League

Knockout phase

Round of 32

|}

Round of 16

|}

Quarter-finals

|}

Semi-finals

|}

Men's football

League season

La Liga

Segunda División

Promotion play-offs

Segunda División B

Group champions' play-offs

Cup competitions

Copa del Rey

Final

Supercopa de España

Copa Federación de España

Final

Women's football

League season

Primera División

Segunda División

Group of four teams for promotion

Group of three teams for promotion

Cup competitions

Copa de la Reina

References

External links
La Liga
Royal Spanish Football Federation

 
2016 in association football
2017 in association football
2016 in Spanish sport
2017 in Spanish sport